Allen, Allan or Alan Roberts may refer to:

Entertainment
Allan Roberts (songwriter) (1905–1966), American lyricist for theatre and film
Alan Roberts (1946–2001), Scottish singer/songwriter/guitarist on Caledonia (Alan Roberts and Dougie MacLean album)
Alan Roberts (filmmaker) (1946–2016), American cult film director and editor
Alan Roberts (broadcaster) (born 1946), English radio presenter, producer and actor
Alan Roberts, American voice actor on List of TaleSpin characters#Kit Cloudkicker during 1990s
Alan Roberts (English singer-songwriter-musician) (born 1982), stage name Jim Noir

Science
 Alan Roberts (environmentalist) (1925-2017), Australian theoretical physicist and environmentalist, active in the  1960s counter-culture
Alan Clive Roberts (born 1934), English consultant and clinical scientist
Alan M. Roberts (born 1941), English electrophysiologist, neuroanatomist and academic
Alan D. Roberts, English physicist and chemist active since 1960s

Sports
Allen Roberts (1922–2015), New Zealand cricketer for Auckland
Alan Roberts (footballer) (born 1964), English right winger during 1980s
Allen Roberts, American guard with 2009–10 Miami RedHawks men's basketball team#Roster

Other
Alan Roberts (1925–2017), Australian Marxist in Eco-socialism#1970s–1990s: rise of environmentalism and engagement with Marxism and socialism
Allan Roberts (politician) (1943–1990), English MP for Bootle
Allen D. Roberts (born 1947), American editor of Sunstone (magazine)#Editors and publishers

See also
Alan Robert (born 1971), American singer/songwriter and comic book creator 
Al Roberts (born 1944), American football coach in Seattle
Al Roberts (One Life to Live), character on American daytime serial (1986–2011); a/k/a Cord Roberts